The Tuncahuán phase culture flourished in the central highlands of Ecuador, and is believed to be traced back to 500 BCE to 500 CE.

There has been very little archaeological research in this region of Ecuador and we still have much to learn from its prehistory.

The first to describe Tuncahuán phase was the Ecuadorian archaeologist Jacinto Caamano Jijón and early twentieth century, based on its investigation five graves in a cemetery.

All the tombs bar one were for adults, and funerary items contained ceramic and copper.

The pottery of this phase is usually decorated with white paint, red slip and negative painting in several different combinations.

A container collection Tuncahuán at SFU is a fountain with pedestal, or compote, with a high base ring which supports a single source without restriction. The high base has been decorated with cuts, incisions and cream slip. The source thereof is engobada cream inside and red at the edge extending downward literally at the outer edge. There is a handprint inside the source could have been made by the potter when collected and his hand was wet with white slip.

As there are no excavations on sites currently which were occupied during the Tuncahuán phase, archaeologists know little about the way of life of the people who produced these ceramics.

History of Ecuador
Archaeological sites in Ecuador